Licking Creek is a  tributary of the Potomac River in Pennsylvania and Maryland in the United States.

Licking Creek is born on the west slope of Tuscarora Mountain, near Cowans Gap State Park, flows through eastern Fulton County and a corner of Franklin County in Pennsylvania, and then enters Washington County in Maryland, to join the Potomac River downstream of Hancock.

See also
List of Maryland rivers
List of rivers of Pennsylvania

References

Rivers of Maryland
Rivers of Pennsylvania
Rivers of Washington County, Maryland
Rivers of Fulton County, Pennsylvania
Rivers of Franklin County, Pennsylvania
Tributaries of the Potomac River